= Arragoussets =

Drawing and details about an Arragousset

The Arragoussets are a type of dwarf from Anglo-Norman folklore. They are often described as fiercely warlike troglodytes who emerged from a cavern, assumed to be Le Creux ès Faïes, on the west coast of Guernsey.

The legend states that they killed every man they encountered, and raped the local women. Only a man and a boy from Saint Andrew's Parish managed to survive by hiding inside an abandoned oven for multiple years. One day, the Arragoussets left their wives and children, with no reason given.
